Trevor Carolan (born 1951) is a Canadian writer. He has published 20 books of non-fiction, poetry, fiction, translations and anthologies.

Early life 

Born in Bradford, Yorkshire, Carolan's family emigrated in 1957 and he grew up in New Westminster near Vancouver, British Columbia.  His stonemason father also ran a folk music-era coffeehouse and he grew up interested in music and art. He has noted his luck as a high-school student there in having veteran Canadian writer Sam Roddan as a teacher. Roddan inspired him to write and had Carolan's early poetry featured on CBC Radio.  At age 17 he also began writing for The Columbian newspaper and contributed articles on San Francisco's Haight-Ashbury music scene where his first introductions were to Bill Graham of the Fillmore West and singer Janis Joplin.  He subsequently traveled extensively in Europe and Asia.  During the winter of 1970, Carolan spent time living at the studio home of visual artist Marcos Irrizarry and Abel Bello in Pozuelo d'Alarcon near Madrid, and he credits the experience for showing him the possibilities of a life in the arts.

Education 

Returned to B.C., Carolan played harmonica in folk-blues units while studying at Douglas College and Simon Fraser University, where he studied Theatre with Richard Ouzounian. His interest in writing grew and led him to Eureka, California where he studied Creative Writing with Jim Dodge while completing his B.A. and M.A.in English at Humboldt State University in Arcata. In 1978, he met poet Allen Ginsberg who encouraged him to continue writing poetry.  Back in Vancouver, he began writing for the Georgia Straight, joined P.W.A.C., and as a freelance journalist wrote for publications throughout Canada and the U.S. Following a lengthy journey through Asia in 1985 he increasingly specialized in East-West arts and letters and his three anthologies of East, Southeast and South Asian short stories have been influential in bringing attention in English to contemporary literature from these regions (see  The Colors of Heaven: Short Stories From the Pacific Rim (Vintage-Random House, 1992;  Another Kind of Paradise: Short Stories from the New Asia-Pacific [Cheng & Tsui, 2010]; and The Lotus Singers: Stories from Contemporary South Asia [Cheng & Tsui, 2011]).

Career 

Carolan has interwoven writing, teaching and arts administrative appointments throughout his career. He served as first Executive Director of the Federation of B.C. Writers in the early Eighties, was Literary Coordinator for the XVth Olympic Winter Games Festival of the Arts in Calgary (1986–88), and Coordinator of Literary Arts at the Banff Centre in 2006.   His publications include co-translations of the modern Taoist classics The Book of the Heart and The Supreme Way; Giving Up Poetry, a memoir of his studies with Allen Ginsberg; and the critically acclaimed Return To Stillness: Twenty Years With A Tai Chi Master.

He has also worked as media advocate on behalf of international human rights, Canadian Aboriginal land claims, famine relief, and Pacific Coast logging and watershed issues. He holds an interdisciplinary Ph.D. from Bond University in Australia, and since 2001 has taught English and Creative Writing at University of the Fraser Valley in Abbotsford, B.C.   The  International Editor for The Pacific Rim Review of Books, he is a regular  contributor for Choice, The Bloomsbury Review, Manoa, Kyoto Journal and Shambhala Sun.  Carolan's novel The Pillow Book of Dr. Jazz is published internationally by Ekstasis Editions. He lives in North Vancouver, Canada, where he served for three years as an elected municipal councillor.

Bibliography

Fiction 

The Pillow Book of Dr. Jazz:  Travels Along Asia's Dharma Trail, Anchor,  Sydney,  1999
Big Whiskers Saves The Cove, Concorde, Vancouver, 1995 (children's environmental mystery)

Non-Fiction 

Return to Stillness: Twenty Years with a Tai Chi Master,  Marlowe & Co., 2003
Giving up Poetry: With Allen Ginsberg At Hollyhock,  Banff Centre Press, 2001

Poetry 

Celtic Highway: Poems & Texts,  Ekstasis, 2002
Closing The Circle, Heron Press; Vancouver, 1985

Anthologies (as editor) 

Cascadia: The Life and Breath of the World, Mānoa Journal/University of Hawaii Press, 2013
The Lotus Singers: Contemporary Stories from South Asia, Editor Cheng & Tsui, 2011
Making Waves: Reading B.C. and Pacific Northwest Literature, Editor Anvil Press, 2010
Along the Rim: The Best of Pacific Rim Review of Books, Vol. II.  Co-ed. Ekstasis, 2010
Another Kind of Paradise: Short Stories from the New Asia-Pacific, editor Cheng & Tsui, 2009
Against the Shore: The Best of Pacific Rim Review of Books, Co-ed,  Ekstasis, 2008
Down In The Valley: Contemporary Writing from B.C.'s Fraser Valley, Editor, Ekstasis, 2004
The Colours of Heaven: Short Stories From The Pacific Rim,  editor,Vintage, N.Y.  1992.

Translation 

The Supreme Way: Inner Teachings of the Southern Mountain Tao, (co-translation with Du  Liang),  North Atlantic, Berkeley, 1997
The Book of the Heart: Embracing the Tao(with Bella Chen), Shambhala Pub. 1990; Heron Press, Vancouver, 1988

References

External links 
Trevor Carolan Website

1951 births
Canadian male novelists
Canadian non-fiction writers
Canadian activists
British Columbia municipal councillors
Living people
Bond University alumni
20th-century Canadian novelists
20th-century Canadian poets
20th-century Canadian male writers
Canadian male poets
21st-century Canadian poets
Canadian anthologists
20th-century Canadian translators
21st-century Canadian translators
21st-century Canadian male writers
Canadian male non-fiction writers
Academic staff of the University of the Fraser Valley